The discography of a British musician of Ghanaian descent, Sway consists of five studio albums and ten singles.

Albums

Studio albums

Extended plays

Mixtapes
 This Is My Promo Vol. 1 (2004, DCypha)
 This Is My Promo Vol. 2 (DCypha)
 This Is My Rave (2006)
 The Dotted Lines Mixtape (2007, DCypha)
 One for the Journey (2007)
 The Signature LP Mixtape (2008, DCypha)
 The Delivery Mixtape (2010, DCypha)
 The Delivery Mixtape 2 - Lost in Transit (2010, DCypha)
 Bring Me to Africa (2010, DCypha)

With the group One
 Onederful World (2002, self-released) – DJ Amaes

Singles

As lead artist

Promotional singles

Guest appearances

Soundtracks
 2011: "Beat The World"

References

Discographies of British artists